The 1988–89 Tehran Province League was the 67th season of Tehran Province League, remembrance of 17th Shahrivar. Persepolis won the league for the 4th time and 3rd time in a row.

Results

Top goalscorers
13 Goals 
  Farshad Pious (Persepolis)

8 Goals
  Samad Marfavi (Daraei)
  Mohammad Falahati (Niroye Zamini)

7 Goals
  Mehrdad Amini Shirazi (Bonyad-e-Shahid)

References

External links
 RSSSF

Iran
1987–88 in Iranian football